Lamerd (also Romanized as Lāmerd and Lāmard, also known as Tarakma) is a city and capital of Lamerd County, Fars Province, Iran. The population was 21,365 with 4,021 families as of the 2006 census. Its main industries are based on its rich natural gas sources. Tabnak, Homa, Shanol, Varavi are important local gas zones. Lamerd Airport serves the city.

Industry 
Aluminum and steel plants have been under construction since 2011 and a magnesium oxide plant has been under construction in the region since 2020. Lamerd International Airport opened in 1964, with flights to Tehran, Shiraz, Lar, Lavan and international flights to Kuwait, Qatar and United Arab Emirates.

Climate

References

External links

Airports

Populated places in Lamerd County
Cities in Fars Province